Amu Dizaj (also Romanized as ‘Amū Dīzaj; also known as ‘Amū Dozjī, ‘Amūd Zajī, and Amzahni) is a village in Kuhsar Rural District, in the Central District of Hashtrud County, East Azerbaijan Province, Iran. At the 2006 census, its population was 378, in 72 families.

References 

Towns and villages in Hashtrud County